"Holy Smokes" is a song by American rappers Trippie Redd featuring fellow American rapper Lil Uzi Vert, released on July 16, 2021 as the second single from the former's fourth studio album, Trip at Knight. The track was released under Trippie Redd's labels 1400 Entertainment and 10k Projects.

Trippie previously called Lil Uzi Vert one of the "Greatest of All Time (GOATS)" of the era, also claiming his album Neon Shark vs Pegasus was inspired by them. Eventually, the two collaborated. On "Holy Smokes", they rap over a synthetic beat described as "catchy".

The song was promoted on TikTok and grew popular on there, with over seven thousand video creations with the sound.

Music video
The music video was released on July 20, 2021 on Trippie Redd's YouTube channel. Directed by Mooch and Grade A Films, the video features both rappers in an arcade and them "enjoying the spoils of success". The video was described as energetic and colorful. It also features a skit at the beginning, with cameos from Twitch streamer Adin Ross.

Charts

Certifications

References

2021 singles
2021 songs
Trippie Redd songs
Lil Uzi Vert songs
Songs written by Trippie Redd
Songs written by Lil Uzi Vert